"All I Ever Needed" is the first single released from Bret Michaels third studio album, Freedom of Sound. The song is a duet with country music singer Jessica Andrews. It was released on October 9, 2004, where it debuted at #57 on the U.S. Billboard Hot Country Songs chart.

Music video
The song features a music video, however, Andrews doesn't appear in it. The video appeared on Billboard's "Hot Videoclip Tracks" chart in 2008. The video was directed by Christie Cook.
A second version of the video with Bret Michaels in Iraq footage was released in 2008 when the song featured on the compilation Rock My World.

Chart performance
"All I Ever Needed" debuted at number 57 on the Hot Country Songs chart on October 9, 2004. The song spent 16 weeks on the country charts, even after the song reached its peak of number 45 in its fourth chart week. The song has also become Michaels' only chart entry on any Billboard chart to date.

References 

2004 singles
Bret Michaels songs
Jessica Andrews songs
Male–female vocal duets
Songs written by Bret Michaels
2004 songs